CFR Title 6 – Domestic Security is one of the 50 titles composing the United States Code of Federal Regulations (CFR) and contains the principal set of rules and regulations issued by federal agencies regarding domestic security. It is available in digital and printed form and can be referenced online using the Electronic Code of Federal Regulations (e-CFR).

Structure 

The table of contents, as reflected in the e-CFR updated February 4, 2022, is as follows:

 06